Versuri și Proză was a Romanian literary and art magazine edited by Alfred Hefter-Hidalgo and I. M. Rașcu, published in Iași from 1912 to 1916. It published work by Benjamin Fondane and Victor Ion Popa.

References

1912 establishments in Romania
1916 disestablishments in Romania
Defunct literary magazines published in Europe
Defunct magazines published in Romania
Magazines established in 1912
Magazines disestablished in 1916
Mass media in Iași
Romanian-language magazines
Literary magazines published in Romania